Bokaro Steel City railway station (station code:- BKSC) is a railway  station on the Gomoh–Muri branch line and Adra–Bokaro Steel City branch line under Adra division of South Eastern Railways. It is located in Bokaro district in the Indian state of Jharkhand.  It lies at the edge of Jharia Coalfield and serves Bokaro Steel City, and the surrounding mining-industrial area.

History
The railway station and the surrounding areas were earlier called Maraphari, in what was then Hazaribagh district. The surrounding areas are still referred to as Maraphari. With the construction of the Bokaro Steel Plant, the railway station was renamed Bokaro Steel City.

Amongst the railway lines earlier laid in the area was the Grand Chord of East Indian Railway Company which was opened in 1906. With the opening up of coalfields in the area between Gomoh and Barkakana,  came the Gomoh–Barkakana line in 1927. The Bengal Nagpur Railway built the line from Nagpur to Asansol and opened it for goods traffic in 1891. The line was extended to Gomoh in 1907 and the Mohuda–Chandrapura link came in 1913.

Distance
It takes 20 minutes to travel from Bokaro Steel City Railway Station to City Centre. Approximate driving distance between Bokaro Steel City Railway Station and City Centre is 20 km. Travel time refers to the time taken if the distance is covered by a car.

Electrification
Railway lines in the Bokaro area (including Bokaro Steel City Yard) were electrified in 1986–89.

Loco shed and yard

Diesel Loco Shed, BKSC -
Also large yard for Bokaro Steel Plant, having WDM-2, WDM-3A, WDG-3A, WDS-6 loco. Loco spotted in a distinctive green/red livery. Current holding of 66 (WDM2-29, WDM3A-20, WDG3A-21, WDS6-12) locos (10/13) for Bokaro Steel Plant and other purpose.

Electric Loco Shed, Bokaro Steel City -
New shed commissioned in 2011 with WAG-5 transferred from other sheds. Holds a few WAG-7 as well. Current holding capacity is 100 (WAG-7-66, WAG-9-44) Locos.

Amenities
Bokaro Steel City railway station has 5 double-bedded non-AC retiring rooms and a four-bedded dormitory.
On platform 1, IRCTC has opened a new food court.
Bokaro station has a fully air-conditioned upper class waiting hall and non-ac second class waiting hall at platform no.1.
Vegetarian and Non-vegetarian canteen on platform no.1.
Cloak Room in parcel office adjacent to platform no.1.
Mobile charging points on all platforms.
Cold water booth on all platforms.
PCO/STD/ISD on all platforms.

Trains
Mail/Express

20839/40 Ranchi Rajdhani Express
22823/24 Bhubaneswar Rajdhani Express
12019/20 Howrah–Ranchi Shatabdi Express
12831/32 Dhanbad–Bhubaneswar Garib Rath Express
12365/66 Ranchi–Patna Jan Shatabdi Express
12801/02 Puri–New Delhi Purushottam Express
12875/76 Puri–Delhi Anand Vihar Neelachal Express
22805/06 Bhubneshwar–New Delhi Superfast Express
13351/52 Dhanbad–Alappuzha Express
18103/04 Tatanagar–Amritsar Jallianwalabagh Express
12817/18 Hatia–Delhi Anand Vihar Terminal Jharkhand Swarna Jayanti Express
12825/26 Ranchi–New Delhi Jharkhand Sampark Kranti Express
12365/66 Patna–Ranchi Jan Shatabdi Express
17005/06 Raxaul–Hyderabad Express
17007/08 Darbhanga–Secunderabad Express
18609/10 Ranchi–Mumbai LTT Express
18621/22 Hatia–Patna Patliputra Express
18623/24 Hatia–Patna–Islampur Express
18625/26 Hatia–Patna–Purnia Court Express
18627/28 Ranchi–Howrah Intercity Express
15027/28 Hatia–Gorakhpur Maurya Express
18618/19 Ranchi–Dumka Intercity Express
15660/61 Kamakhya–Ranchi Express
13425/26 Surat–Malda Town Express
13304/05 Ranchi–Dhanbad Intercity Express
13403/04 Ranchi–Bhagalpur Vananchal Express
18603/04 Ranchi–Bhagalpur Express
18605/06 Ranchi–Jaynagar Express
13319/20 Deoghar–Ranchi Intercity Express

Passenger train
58014/15 Bokaro Steel City–Howrah Fast Passenger
63591/92 Bokaro Steel City–Asansol MEMU
63595/96 Bokaro Steel City–Asansol MEMU
58033/34 Bokaro Steel City–Ranchi Passenger
53341/42 Dhanbad–Muri Passenger
68019/20 Jhargram–Chandrapura MEMU
53061/62 Barddhaman–Hatia Passenger
53335/36 Dhanbad–Ranchi Passenger

References

External links

Trains at Bokaro Steel City

Railway stations in Bokaro district
Adra railway division
Bokaro Steel City